Mount Minami-heito is a mountain,  high, surmounting the southeastern extremity of the Langhovde Hills, on the coast of Queen Maud Land, Antarctica. It was mapped from surveys and air photos by the Japanese Antarctic Research Expedition (JARE), 1957–62. The name "Minami-heito-zan" (south flat top mountain) was given by JARE Headquarters in 1973 and is in association with the name of Mount Heitō just northward.

References

Mountains of Queen Maud Land
Prince Harald Coast